Air Marshal Man Mohan Sinha, PVSM, AVSM, VM, is a retired Indian Air Force Officer and a veteran of the Indo-Pakistani War of 1965. He was honoured with a number of medals including the Param Vishist Seva Medal, the Ati Vishisht Seva Medal and the Vayusena Medal.

Early life and education
Man Mohan Sinha was born on 8 January 1933 at Bhubaneswar, Bihar and Orissa Province, British India. He was educated at St. Xavier's High School, Patna.

Military career
He joined the National defense academy (Indian military academy) in the then Inter services wing in 1948. He was then commissioned to the Indian Air Force as a pilot officer on 17 January 1953, serving in 3rd squadron (1953-1961). Subsequently, he became the Air Force ADC to Dr. Rajender Prasad (1961-1962) and Dr. Radhakrishnan (1962-1964), after which he transferred to 7th squadron (1964-1967), taking part in the 1965 Indo-Pakistan war.

1965 Indo-Pakistan War achievements
Sinha was a part of No. 7 Squadron IAF as a Squadron leader during the 1965 war against Pakistan. Squadron Leaders MM Sinha, SS Malik, AS Lamba, Dice Dhiman etc. making their mark in various missions during 1965 war. SS Malik, AS Lamba, PS Pingle, AR Gandhi received the Vir Chakra, along with Man Mohan Sinha, DK Dhiman, CG Pander, P Kondaiah who earned a Mention-in-Despatches for combat operations.

Command of No. 37 Squadron IAF
No. 37 Squadron IAF (Black Panthers) moved to Tezpur from Chabua at the end of March 1966, where command of the Squadron passed to then Wing Commander Man Mohan Sinha on 25 August 1967.

After the war he sat for the staff college exam; standing first amongst all three services in the staff college exam, he was thus sent to the Joint Service Defence College in England. Graduating in 1970, he flew in the Indo-Pakistani War of 1971; after which he first served as an instructor at the College of Air Warfare (then known as the Joint Air Warfare School) and then the Defence Services Staff College. Then joining the Indian Ministry of Defence Mod in 1975.

AOC-in-C of Eastern Command IAF
He was a Commanding Officer for Eastern Air Command at Shillong from 8 February 1988 – 31 January 1991 at the post of Air Marshal.

Air Vice Marshal
He became Air vice Marshal in

Air Marshal
Man Mohan then served as Air Marshal of the Indian Air force.

Post Retirement
After retirement, Man Mohan Sinha serves in the position of chairman of Velocity Apparelz Company in Ismailia, Egypt since 2001 along with his son Siddharth Sinha who is the CEO of parent company Vogue International Agencies FZE.

Awards and decorations

See also
 The India-Pakistan Air War of 1965
 Indo-Pakistani Air War of 1965

References

External links
 
 How I Too Nearly Missed The War! – Air Vice Marshal Ajit Lamba VrC
 Embassy of India, Cairo | Bilateral | India-Egypt | Economic | Indian Companies in Egypt

1933 births
Living people
People from Bihar
St. Xavier's Patna alumni
Indian aviators
Indian Air Force air marshals
Recipients of the Param Vishisht Seva Medal
Recipients of the Ati Vishisht Seva Medal
Recipients of the Vayu Sena Medal
Indian Air Force officers
Indian military personnel of the Indo-Pakistani War of 1971
Pilots of the Indo-Pakistani War of 1965
Pilots of the Indo-Pakistani War of 1971
Academic staff of the Defence Services Staff College
Academic staff of the College of Air Warfare